This list contains the names of albums that contain a hidden track and also information on how to find them. Not all printings of an album contain the same track arrangements, so some copies of a particular album may not have the hidden track(s) listed below. Some of these tracks may be hidden in the pregap, and some hidden simply as a track following the listed tracks. The list is ordered by artist name using the surname where appropriate.

 Brad Paisley:
 Mud on the Tires: A blooper for "Spaghetti Western Swing" after the last track
 Time Well Wasted: 5 hidden tracks after the final track, most are bloopers on "Cornography"
 American Saturday Night: hidden track after final track, Welcome to the Future instrumental "Back to the Future" (1:30)
 Pantera, The Great Southern Trendkill: Approximately 90 seconds after the final track, Sandblasted Skin (Reprise), fades out, the song fades back in, continuing from where it left off.
 Papa Roach:
 Old Friends From Young Years: An unlisted/untitled track (Commonly titled "Happy Birthday") plays after a pause after the last track "Thanx." It is a recording of bass player Tobin Esperance as a child.
 Infest:A softer version of "Tightrope" from the Let 'Em Know EP about a minute after "Thrown Away" has finished.
 Parokya ni Edgar: "Bagsakan" collaboration album. In the extended version of the song Bagsakan was finished after two seconds, the song Pedro Basura Man which was a parody of Popeye the Sailor Man's theme music will be heard.
 Sean Paul, Stage One After the outro, there's a reprise of the song "Haffi Get De Gal Ya (Hot Gal Today)"
 Pearl Jam:
 Binaural: "Writer's Block" after the final track "Parting Ways"
 Lost Dogs: "4/20/02" after the final track "Bee Girl"
 Pearl Jam: Brief hidden track after the final track "Inside Job"
 Ten: "Master/Slave" after the final track "Release." The first thirty seconds of the hidden track can also be heard at the beginning of "Once."
 Yield: "Hummus" after the final track "All Those Yesterdays"
 Jack Peñate, Matinee: Acoustic Version of "Learning Lines" at the end of last track "When We Die"
 Pencey Prep: the last song on the album Heartbreak in Stereo is a hidden song known as "Fat and Alone."
 Pennywise:
 Unknown Road: "Slow Down" after the final track "Clear Your Head"
 Full Circle: an instrumental piano piece lasting around twelve minutes plays at 10:50 of the final track Bro Hymn. This track was a last minute addition by Ronnie King and is based on a song Fletcher Dragge learned from his mother. The piece does not appear on the vinyl issue of the album.
 A Perfect Circle, Mer de Noms: Briefly after the final track "Over" there is a short medley consisting of vocal excerpts from all the songs on the album together with a kind of swelling synth background sound. The volume of this medley is extremely low and therefore can only be heard at a high volume setting.
 Perry Garfunkle and the Disappearing Delta: Dinasoul: Secret track appears 4 minutes 20 seconds after the conclusion of the final track, Letter to the Editor (of the Universe)
 Katy Perry: North American version of Teenage Dream: "California Gurls" (Passion Pit Main Mix) & "Teenage Dream" (Kaskade Club Remix).
 Pet Shop Boys, Very: Go West: In the album version, at 7:07, after approximately two minutes of silence, "Postscript (I Believe in Ecstasy)", sung by Chris Lowe, can be heard. 
 Tom Petty:
 Full Moon Fever: "Hello CD Listeners", featured on the CD version of this album, is played immediately after "Runnin' Down a Dream" with the following message: "Hello, CD listeners. We've come to the point in this album where those listening on cassette or record will have to stand up (or sit down) and turn over the record (or tape). In fairness to those listeners, we'll now take a few seconds before we begin side two........ thank you. Here is side two."
 Into the Great Wide Open: "Hello Cassette Listeners", featured on the cassette version of this album, plays immediately after "All or Nothin'" at the end of Side 1. A brief spoken interlude by Petty, much like "Hello CD Listeners" from Full Moon Fever, this time Petty instructs the cassette listener on how to properly flip over their tape and prepare it for Side 2. "What's in Here?" is played immediately after "Out in the Cold." Tom Petty asks, "What's in here?" followed by the sound of a closet door opening along with ambient noise from a sea dock, including the sound of a harmonica. Petty nonchalantly says "Oh," and the closet closes.
 PFR: Goldie's Last Day: "Gargle Solo" follows the final track "Wait for the Sun"
 Anthony Phillips, Wise After The Event: Side one of the original vinyl ended with an unlisted instrumental, "Hunt Link," which was a preview of the album's closing track "Now What (Are They Doing to My Little Friends?)." On the 1990 CD reissue this is still unlisted and is included at the end of track 4 (the title track), thus keeping its original position within the album.
 Phlebotomized, Skycontact: There is a hidden pregap track, rewind about 7:51 before the track 1.
 Pierce The Veil: On the Australian edition of their second album, Selfish Machines, there is Bulletproof Love (Acoustic) and Caraphernelia (Acoustic) after the last listed track, The Sky Under the Sea.
 The Pietasters:
 The Pietasters: Extended version of "Factory Concerto" after the final track "Without You"
 Awesome Mix Tape vol. 6: "Menowannalikki-u" after the final track "Dub-Fi (Superdeformed Mix)"
 Pillar: After the song "One Thing," there is an insanely tight instrumental/breakdown. 
 The Pillows:
 Little Busters: After the song "Little Busters," there's a hidden track at the end called by fans, "Little Busters Redeux," because it is a slower, more electronic version of "Little Busters." 
 Penalty Life: After the song "The Scar Whispers Nobody is in Paradise," there's a hidden track at the end called "I'm a Broken Piece," which is a self cover of one of their early songs. 
 FLCL No.2: King of Pirates: "ONE LIFE." This song appeared on the first FLCL Soundtrack, but plays on Track 17, "I think I can" at 3:33.
 Fool on the planet: "Hybrid Rainbow" is followed by a jazz composition "Secret Slogan."
 Smile: About two minutes after the final track "Calvero" comes the hidden track officially named "Son of a Beach," a ukulele piece.
 Pink:
 Try This: "Hooker" (only on the explicit version of the album)
 I'm Not Dead: "I Have Seen the Rain." This song follows 30 seconds of silence after the last track on the album. It features her dad, Jim Moore.
 Pink Floyd:
 The Division Bell: At the end of the album, Gilmour's stepson, Charlie, can be heard hanging up the telephone on *Pink Floyd manager Steve O'Rourke, who had pleaded to be allowed to appear on a Pink Floyd album, and on some vinyl issues, the sound of a heartbeat is in the locked groove at the end of each side.
 The Dark Side of the Moon: At the end of the album, an orchestral version of the Beatles' "Ticket to Ride" can be heard in the background amongst the heartbeats (although this may be simply a fault in the recording process, for instance an improperly formatted tape). Also, on all editions is "Breathe (Reprise)" at the end of the fourth track, "Time." The lyrics to this song are included, but it is not on the track listing.
 Pulse: On the cassette version, both the A side and the B side contain hidden tracks: "One of These Days" and a soundscape. The soundscape has been rumoured to be Pink Floyd's final, unreleased album The Big Spliff
 Atom Heart Mother: The dripping tap sound at the end of the album was sometimes locked into the inner groove on vinyl editions so it would play infinitely until the stylus was removed from the vinyl. On CD versions, the dripping tap plays for 17 seconds after the rest of the song has finished.
 Echoes: The Best of Pink Floyd: The hidden track ("Breathe (Reprise)") at the end of "Time" is left at the end of the original track.
 Pink Guy, Pink Season: There is a short ending after several minutes of silence of the song "Hand on My Gat".
 Pitchshifter:
 Submit:  Final track "Tendrill (Version)" contains hidden track "Silo" (starts at 5:42).
 Desensitized: Final track "Routine" contains hidden track. This is re-recorded version of "Landfill" from Industrial album (track starts at 27:18).
 Infotainment?: Nulltrack: "Data Track".
 Deviant: At 3:35 of "P.S.I.cological" there is a hidden message adding up as a track.
 PSI: At 9:58 of "Shen-an-doah" there is a hidden song called Trancer, which was featured as a B-side on the "Eight Days" CD single.
 Pixies, Surfer Rosa (1988): Of the 13 listed tracks, track 11 is just Black Francis having a humorous conversation in which he repeatedly shouts "You fuckin' die!" at Kim Deal. The track numbers on all subsequent songs are off by one.
 Placebo:
 Black Market Music: "Black Market Blood," hidden after "Peeping Tom" at 10:14
 Placebo: "Hong Kong Farewell," hidden after "Swallow" at 14:52
 Sleeping With Ghosts: A short instrumental follows "Special Needs" which starts at 4:22
 Without You I'm Nothing: "Evil Dildo," hidden after "Burger Queen" at 14:46
 Plaid, Rest Proof Clockwork: "Air Locked" (Track 15) contains a secret part named "Face Me" sung by Alison Goldfrapp.
 Planet Funk, Non Zero Sumness: Track 11 has a hidden track, entitled "Rosa Blu", which begins at the 7:05 marker.
 Pleymo, Keçkispasse, "Vost"
 Plumb, Plumb: "Pluto" follows the final track "Send Angels"
 Pnau, Again: On the original 2003 Australian release, track 13 entitled "Bubbles 'n' Mum" has two parts: the first part of the track runs for approximately 1:10, and the second part of the track begins at approximately the 18:52 mark and runs to the end of the track, with almost 18 minutes of silence between them.
 Poe's album "Hello"
 Porcupine Tree, Deadwing: "Shesmovedon" following silence after "Glass Arm Shattering" on US versions of the album. On UK versions it is a separate track but unlisted.
 Signify: A brief snippet from an old Saturday Night Live episode follows a few seconds of silence after the final track "Dark Matter".
 P.O.S, Never Better (2009): "Handmade Handguns."
 P.O.D.,Snuff the Punk (1994): "Abortion Is Murder" is an unlisted, hidden track on the remastered album.
 The Pony Gang: Equestriana (1998): After "Pay the Man" ends at 8:10, there's 2 minutes of Silence followed by a Mariachi reprise version of "Pretty Fly (For a White Guy)" from 10:10-11:14 (end of the song). The hidden track is Only available on the Original CD list. On the final release, the silence and the Hidden track is omitted on November 14, 2000 following the release of Conspiracy of Pony three days later.
 Conspiracy of Pony (2000): On the Enhanced CD Version, there's a few Bonus tracks including "Autonomy" (from "Want You Bad") "Sin City" (from "Million Miles Away") and "One Hundred Punks (Generation-X Cover, ft. Miles Prower)".
 Pore, Dorsale: Track 10 is an unlisted hidden track.
 Powderfinger:
 Double Allergic: The B-sides "Vladmir," "SS" and "Come Away," hidden after "(Return Of) The Electric Horseman" at 8:09
 Odyssey Number Five: Another song starts at 5:35 on the track "Whatever Makes You Happy."
 Powerman 5000:
 The Blood-Splat Rating System: "File Under Action" follows about a minute of silence after the final listed track "Even Superman Shot Himself." This is also present on their later album 'Mega!! Kung Fu Radio'.
 Tonight the Stars Revolt!: "Watch the Sky for Me" contains an untitled hidden track, though fans agree for its name to be "The World of the Dead." It is found at 4:20 of the song.
 Anyone for Doomsday?: After 35 seconds of silence after the last track "The Future That Never Was" a strange transmission like sound with some additional beats before cutting off completely. 
 Primer 55, Introduction to Mayhem: In the end of the track "Trippinthehead," there's a hidden track with almost all profanities from the album.
 Primus, Antipop: A studio version of "The Heckler" follows a period of silence that comes after the album's last song, "Coattails of a Dead Man."
 The presidents of the United States of America, Pure Frosting: "Hot Carl" – 0:16 follows a long period of silence (just over 5 minutes) after the last track "Lump (Live)" – 2:58.
 Lisa Marie Presley, To Whom It May Concern: After the title track ends at 4:36, there is 21 seconds of silence and then the song 'Excuse Me'
 Lisa Marie Presley, Now What: A cover version of The Ramones' 'Here Today, Gone Tomorrow' is after the track 'Now What'.
 Pretty Balanced: Conical Monocle: "Seizure Dome" follows three minutes of silence after the final listed track, "Jazz."
 Primordial, Spirit the Earth Aflame: "To Enter Pagan" at the end of the album.
 Prince:
 Newpower Soul: following many silent tracks, No. 49 is the song, "Wasted Kisses."
 Rave Un2 the Joy Fantastic: a few minutes after the final listed album track is a brief "commercial" followed by the track "Prettyman."
 20Ten: following many silent tracks, No. 77 is the song, "Laydown."
 The Prize Fighter Inferno: "My Brother's Blood Machine": "78" on track 78 (Follows 66 tracks of silence titled "The Space Between The Songs: I-LXVI").
 Probot, Probot: Hidden track begins at 8:56 of track 11, sung by Jack Black of Tenacious D.
 Prodigal, Electric Eye: Side 2 of the vinyl LP has a second groove inside the normal locked groove that triggers tonearm auto-return on most turntables. Audio in this groove is a small Commodore 64 program that can be run if transferred to a cassette tape and loaded using a Commodore Datasette player. It displays a single screen showing quotations attributed to Albert Einstein and Jesus Christ.
 The Prodigy:
 Electronic Punks: Making Of "Poison" starts after the credits.
 Their Law: The Singles 1990–2005: "Always Outnumbered Never Outgunned (Demo Mix)" is a hidden track.
 Professor Elemental: Apequest: track 23 is blank (lasting 2:43), while track 24 parodies the deactivation of HAL 9000 in the 1968 film 2001: A Space Odyssey (2:18 in length). While no mention of the blank track is given, the hidden track is titled "(not particularly) Secret Track" in the album's listing on the Professor Elemental website. Neither track is listed on the Tea Sea Records website.
 ProjeKct Two, Live Groove: Thirty seconds after the final track, we hear nine minutes of audience noise—their response to a camera flash causing guitarist Robert Fripp to abandon stage mid-song (Mr Fripp has a strict no-photos-or-recording policy, announced before each performance).
 Propagandhi: Supporting Caste: The band does a cover of Come To The Sabbat by Black Widow 
 Protest the Hero, Fortress: A piano piece found in the pre-track gap of Track 1. Found by rewinding past the beginning of Bloodmeat.
 Prussian Blue: Fragment of the Future: "Lo," hidden after "The Road To Valhalla" and "Skinhead Boy" after "Sisters."
 Psychostick, We Couldn't Think of a Title: 6:54 into "Fake My Own Death and Go Platinum," outtakes of various songs on the album begin playing.
 Public Enemy, Muse Sick-n-Hour Mess Age: "AKA Ferocious Soul" found in the pregap; rewind from the beginning of Track 1 "Whole Lotta Love Goin on in the Middle of Hell"
 Puffy AmiYumi, Nice.: There are several minutes of silence after the last track "Tomodachi(Friends)," followed by a 20-second teaser of the song "Angel of Love" played backwards and a girl saying "Nice!" at the end.
 Pulp – This is Hardcore: Although the final track, track 12, "The Last Day of the Revolution", seems to finish around five minutes in, the synthesiser sound from the end of the song continues to play for another ten minutes, bringing the song to the length of 14:53. On versions with bonus tracks, there is only about a minute of this continued synthesiser sound so it actually concludes at 5:53.
 Puncture, Puncture: There are two untitled hidden tracks at the end of the album.
 Pungent Stench, Club Mondo Bizarre – For Members Only: Contains four hidden tracks. There are karaoke versions of the songs "Klyster Boogie", "Hydrocephalus", "Treatments of Pain" and "Rape - Pagar Con La Misma Moneda".
 Pure Reason Revolution: The Dark Third: After about five minutes after the song He Tried To Show Them Magic!/Ambassadors Return comes the song Asleep Under Eiderdown, which is exactly three minutes.

See also
 List of backmasked messages
 List of albums with tracks hidden in the pregap

References 

P